Case House may refer to:

Case-Shiras-Dearmore House, Mountain Home, Arkansas, NRHP-listed
C.B. Case Motor Co. Building, Mountain View, Arkansas, NRHP-listed
Benomi Case House, Windsor, Connecticut, NRHP-listed
Lloyd Case House, Honolulu, Hawaii, NRHP-listed
Foreman-Case House, Delphi, Indiana, NRHP-listed
Larnerd Case House, Des Moines, Iowa, NRHP-listed
Morgan-Case Homestead, Phillipsburg, Montana, NRHP-listed
Case Farmstead, Pattenburg, New Jersey, NRHP-listed
Case-Dvoor Farmstead, Raritan, New Jersey, NRHP-listed
Case Mansion, Canton, Ohio, formerly listed on the NRHP
J. I. Case Plow Works Building, Oklahoma City, Oklahoma, NRHP-listed
William Case Farm, Champoeg, Oregon, NRHP-listed
Case House (Parkersburg, West Virginia), NRHP-listed

See also
Case Brothers Historic District, Manchester, Connecticut, NRHP-listed